The FV Diefflen is a German association football club from the Diefflen suburb of Dillingen, Saarland.

The club's greatest success has been to earn promotion to the tier five Oberliga Rheinland-Pfalz/Saar in 2014.

History
The club was formed in 1907, originally under the name of FC Diefflen. At the time a number of loosely organised clubs existed in Diefflen which all merged into the current club, FV Diefflen, in 1919. At the end of the First World War, Diefflen, like the rest of the Saarland, was occupied by the French military. The new club had a good relationship with the later which helped in the formation and lead to the first three games of the new FV being played against French military teams. From 1920 onwards the club participated in competitive football. The club struggled for many years to find a home ground, until 1927 when the Dillinger Hüttenwerk leased grounds to the former for 99 years. Diefflen rose to the Kreis-Liga Saar-Mosel by 1930, the local second division of football, where it faced much stronger opposition, like Eintracht Trier.

In post-Second World War football FV Diefflen played a number of seasons in the tier-three Amateurliga Saarland, the highest league in state, from 1956 to 1961 and, again from 1962 to 1964 and in 1970–71. The later meant a more permanent departure from the states highest league, with FV Diefflen not to return to this level for 40 years. The following season, 1971–72, it dropped from the 2. Amateurliga as well. After an era of local amateur football play the club returned as a lower table side in the Bezirksliga Saarland-West in 1978–79 and, again, from 1990 to 1994 but was relegated again on both occasions. It took until 2004 for Diefflen to make another return to the Bezirksliga, after a championship in the Kreisliga A which the club had played in for the previous decade. Now a stronger side the club took only two season to earn another promotion, to the Landesliga Saarland-Südwest in 2006.

FV Diefflen's rise continued in 2009 when it won promotion to the now expanded Verbandsliga Saarland. The Saarlandliga having been introduced in 2009 the club earned promotion to this league as well in 2011, after a second place in the Verbandsliga.

FV Diefflen finished the 2013–14 season as the runners-up of the Saarlandliga and thereby qualified for the promotion round with the runners-up of the Rheinlandliga, SV Morbach, and the Verbandsliga Südwest, FC Fortuna Mombach. With a win and a draw in this round the club earned promotion to the Oberliga Rheinland-Pfalz/Saar for the first time in its history. It was relegated back to the Saarlandliga after one season there but won the 2015–16 league championship there and returned to the Oberliga.

Honours
The club's honours:
 Saarlandliga
 Champions: 2016
 Runners-up: 2014
 Verbandsliga Saarland
 Runners-up: 2011
 Landesliga Saarland-Südwest
 Runners-up: 2009
 Bezirksliga Saarland-West
 Champions: 2006
 2. Amateurliga Saar-West
 Champions: 1962, 1970

Recent seasons
The recent season-by-season performance of the club:

With the introduction of the Regionalligas in 1994 and the 3. Liga in 2008 as the new third tier, below the 2. Bundesliga, all leagues below dropped one tier. With the introduction of the Saarlandliga in 2009 all leagues below dropped one tier.

Key

References

External links
 Official team site  
 Das deutsche Fußball-Archiv  historical German domestic league tables

Football clubs in Germany
Football clubs in Saarland
Association football clubs established in 1907
1907 establishments in Germany